"Mammas Don't Let Your Babies Grow Up to Be Cowboys" is a country music song first recorded by Ed Bruce, written by him and his wife Patsy Bruce. His version of the song appears on his 1976 self-titled album for United Artists Records. In late 1975 and early 1976, Bruce's rendition of the song went to number 15 on the Hot Country Singles charts. This song was featured on Chris LeDoux's album released January 20, 1976, Songbook of the American West.

Members of the Western Writers of America chose the song as one of the Top 100 Western songs of all time.

Content
The narrator warns mothers not to let their children become cowboys because of the tough and rootless life of cowboy culture.

Chart performance

Waylon Jennings/Willie Nelson version

Waylon Jennings and Willie Nelson covered the song on their 1978 duet album Waylon & Willie. This rendition peaked at No. 1 in March 1978, spending four weeks atop the country music charts. It also reached 42 on the Billboard Hot 100, and won the 1979 Grammy Award for Best Country Performance by a Duo or Group with Vocal.  Also in 1979, Nelson's version was featured in the film The Electric Horseman with Robert Redford and Jane Fonda. It is also featured in a 2015 TV commercial for the Volkswagen Passat.

Chart performance

Gibson/Miller Band version

In 1994, country music group Gibson/Miller Band recorded a cover version on its album Red, White and Blue Collar. This version peaked at #49 on the Hot Country Songs chart, and was featured in the soundtrack for the movie The Cowboy Way. It also appeared on the band's second and final studio album, Red, White and Blue Collar.

Chart performance

References

Songs about cowboys and cowgirls
1975 songs
Waylon Jennings songs
Willie Nelson songs
Male vocal duets
1975 singles
1978 singles
1994 singles
Billboard Hot Country Songs number-one singles of the year
Ed Bruce songs
Gibson/Miller Band songs
Songs written by Ed Bruce
United Artists Records singles
RCA Records Nashville singles
Epic Records singles
Music videos directed by Sherman Halsey
Song recordings produced by Doug Johnson (record producer)
Song recordings produced by Larry Butler (producer)
Songs written by Patsy Bruce